Harraiya is a constituency of the Uttar Pradesh Legislative Assembly covering the city of Harraiya in the Basti district of Uttar Pradesh India.

Harraiya is one of five assembly constituencies in the Basti Lok Sabha constituency. Since 2008, this assembly constituency is numbered 307 amongst 403 constituencies.

Members of Legislative Assembly

Election results

2022

2017
Currently this seat belongs to Bharatiya Janta Party candidate Ajay Kumar Singh who won in last Assembly election of 2017 Uttar Pradesh Legislative Elections defeating Samajwadi Party candidate Raj Kishor Singh by a margin of 30,106 votes.

16th Vidhan Sabha: 2012 General Elections

References

External links
 

Assembly constituencies of Uttar Pradesh
Basti district